Kambreško is a settlement in the hills above the right bank of the Soča River in the Municipality of Kanal ob Soči in the Littoral region of Slovenia, next to the border with Italy.

The local church in the hamlet of Srednje, which is part of Kambreško, is dedicated to the Holy Trinity and belongs to the parish of Ročinj.

References

External links
Kambreško on Geopedia
Kambreško on the Kanal Tourist Information site

Populated places in the Municipality of Kanal